René Duverger (30 January 1911 – 16 August 1983) was a French weightlifter who won a gold medal in the 67.5 kg category at the 1932 Summer Olympics in Los Angeles.

References

1911 births
1983 deaths
French male weightlifters
Olympic weightlifters of France
Weightlifters at the 1932 Summer Olympics
Weightlifters at the 1936 Summer Olympics
Medalists at the 1932 Summer Olympics
Olympic gold medalists for France
Olympic medalists in weightlifting
People associated with physical culture
20th-century French people